The Repeal of the "Implementation of the NICS Improvement Amendments Act of 2007" was legislation introduced in the United States House of Representatives on January 30, 2017 by Representative Sam Johnson of Texas. The bill repeals a rule issued by the Social Security Administration that would have required Federal agencies to identify individuals who receive disability insurance benefits under Title II of the Social Security Act or Supplemental Security Income and have been "determination by a court, board, commission, or other lawful authority that a person, as a result of marked subnormal intelligence, or mental illness, incompetency, condition, or disease: (1) Is a danger to himself or to others; or (2) Lacks the mental capacity to contract or manage his own affairs." in order to potentially prohibit such individuals from purchasing firearms or from having other purchase firearms on their behalf. The repeal was signed into law by President Donald Trump on February 28, 2017.

Background 
On December 19, 2016, during the Presidential transition of Donald Trump, the Social Security Administration issued the Implementation of the NICS Improvement Amendments Act of 2007. The rule reads in part:

The rule would require that the Social Security administration report to the Attorney General recipients found to be disabled in order for them to be added to the National Instant Criminal Background Check System. To qualify for reporting, an individual would have had to meet two criteria:

determination by a court, board, commission, or other lawful authority that a person, as a result of marked subnormal intelligence, or mental illness, incompetency, condition, or disease: Is a danger to himself or to others
They have to be receiving full disability benefits and couldn't find work.
They require the assistance of a third party to manage their own benefits.
It was estimated that around 9% of the disability awardee population would have met this criteria (75,000 individuals).

Support and opposition
The bill was supported by the ACLU, the National Association for Mental Health, The American Association of People with Disabilities, and the National Council on Disability, the Consortium for Citizens with Disabilities, as well as other disability rights advocates. The initial regulation was supported by the Brady Campaign to Stop Gun Violence, Moms Demand Action Against Gun Violence, Democratic gun control advocates, and some mental health experts.

Passage 

On February 2, 2017, the repeal was debated and passed in the House. The final vote was 235–180, and was tabulated mostly along party lines. 229 Republicans and 6 Democrats voted in favor, while 2 Republicans and 178 Democrats voted against.

The United States Senate passed the repeal on February 15, 2017. Democrats Joe Donnelly of Indiana, Heidi Heitkamp of North Dakota, Joe Manchin of West Virginia, along with Independent Angus King of Maine, joined with all the Republicans in approving the bill.

The repeal was signed into law by President Donald Trump on February 28, 2017.

See also 
Gun politics in the United States

References

Acts of the 115th United States Congress
Gun politics in the United States
Presidency of Donald Trump